Katarzyna Glinka (born 19 April 1977) is a Polish film and theatre actress and television presenter.

Biography 
She graduated from the Secondary High School and Secondary Music School of the first degree in Dzierżoniów. In 2001 she graduated from the Acting Faculty of the National Film School in Łódź.

She made her theatre debut on 23 February 2002 at the Stefan Jaracz Theatre in Olsztyn.

Since 2007, she has played Kasia Górka in the Polish soap opera Barwy szczęścia, which made her nationally known. Also in 2007, she participated in the program Gwiazdy tańczą na lodzie. In 2008 she became an actress at the Kwadrat Theatre in Warsaw. In 2008–2009 she co-hosted the game show Fort Boyard. From 2009 to 2010, she played Roma in the Polish series Tancerze.

In 2010, together with Stefano Terrazzino, she became a finalist of the eleventh edition of Taniec z gwiazdami, and was ranked 51st in the ranking of the 100 most valuable Polish show business stars by Forbes. In 2011 she was nominated for the Złota Kaczka Award for her role in Och, Karol 2.

She played Marta, the main character in the Polish comedy Wkręceni (2014). In 2015, she participated in the fourth edition of the show Twoja twarz brzmi znajomo, and she donated the prize for winning the seventh episode (a check worth 10,000 PLN) to Fundacja Spełnionych Marzeń. Between 2017 and 2018, she played Matylda in the Polsat soap opera Przyjaciółki.

Private life 
She has lived in Warsaw since 2003. She was married to Przemysław Gołdon, with whom she has a son Filip (born 2 February 2012). As of 2019, she is engaged to Jarosław Bieniecki, with whom she has a son Leo (born 5 May 2020).

Filmography 

 2002–2004: Klan, as Dominika Szulc, Agnieszka's and Tomek's college friend
 2002: Szpital na perypetiach, as nurse Aśka "Nowa"
 2002–2003: Samo życie, as Justyna, Czarek's girlfriend
 2003: Lokatorzy, as Iga Morawska
 2003: Kasia i Tomek, as a girl
 2004: Panienki, as Celina
 2004–2005: Na dobre i na złe, as nurse Karina
 2005: Zakręcone, as Celina
 2005: Kryminalni, as Klaudia (episode 29)
 2006: Francuski numer, as Magda's friend
 2006: My Baby, as Jola Kurowska, Zosia's friend
 2006–2007: Pierwsza miłość, as orderly Justyna Zarzecka
 2007: Niania, as Patrycja
 2007: Dlaczego nie!, as receptionist
 2007–present: Barwy szczęścia, as Kasia Górka
 2009–2010: Tancerze, as Roma Kowalska
 2011: Wyjazd integracyjny, as model Gabi
 2011: Och, Karol 2, as Adrianna Matysik
 2012: Od pełni do pełni, as Lenka Lipowska
 2014: Wkręceni, as Marta
 2014: Karol, który został świętym, as Małgorzata, Kacper's mother
 2016: 7 rzeczy, których nie wiecie o facetach, as Dominika
 2017-2018: Przyjaciółki, as Matylda
 2017: Na układy nie ma rady, as Renata Niewiadomska
 2017: Daleko od noszy. Reanimacja, as nurse Rita Różalska
 2021: Komisarz Mama

Polish dubbing 

 2003: Girls in love
 2008: Tinker Bell, as Silvermist
 2009: Tinker Bell and the Lost Treasure, as Silvermist
 2010: Megamind, as Roxanne Ritchie
 2010: Tinker Bell and the Great Fairy Rescue, as Silvermist
 2011: Tinker Bell and the Secret of the Wings, as Silvermist
 2014: The Pirate Fairy, as Silvermist
 2015: Tinker Bell and the Legend of the NeverBeast, as Silvermist

References

External links 

 

Polish actresses
1977 births
Living people
Polish television actresses
Polish television presenters
Polish film actresses
Łódź Film School alumni